Becky Stark is an American artist,  singer, songwriter and entertainer from Los Angeles, California. She is the voice of the band Lavender Diamond.

Music

Stark participated in the new folk movement and the LA underground punk/noise scene.  She has performed extensively as a solo artist and leader of the Lavender Diamond band.  

She appeared in the November 2007 Vanity Fair "Folk Music Heroes" portfolio by Annie Leibovitz on the page between Joni Mitchell and Judy Collins.  In addition to her work with Lavender Diamond she sings with The Living Sisters, a folk trio with Eleni Mandell and Inara George from the Bird and the Bee.

The 2007 Lavender Diamond album Imagine Our Love was released on Matador and Rough Trade Records.  A film to accompany the album is currently in production in IMAX format.

Becky Stark appeared with Lavender Diamond performing "You" in the movie One Day Like Rain. In 2008 she wrote the "Songs of the Believers" for the film City of Ember starring Bill Murray, directed by Gil Kenan and produced by Tom Hanks.  The film is a post-apocalyptic action-adventure story for children.  In the film Becky plays the Songmaster.  She also stars in an upcoming short film version of a short story from Miranda July's book No one Belongs Here More Than You.  Based on the story "Birthmark", the short is called "White Light". Kim Gordon and Liz Goldwyn also star in the film directed by Alia Raza.
Stark appeared onstage as the musical guest in The Daily Show creator Ben Karlin's new variety show, singing with Zooey Deschanel and accompanied by OK Go. In 2009 she wrote, directed and appeared in the web series Califunya!

She is co-author of the Peace Comics with cartoonist Ron Rege, Jr., the drummer in Lavender Diamond.  She and Ron Rege have a band together, The Mystical Unionists.

She appears as a character/vocalist on the Decemberists' 2009 concept album The Hazards of Love.  
She sings as the character Margaret and sings on the tracks "Won't Want for Love (Margaret in the Taiga)","Isn't It a Lovely Night?", "The Abduction of Margaret", and "The Hazards of Love 4 (The Drowned)."
She appeared with her band at the 2009 South by Southwest festival.

References

External links

 Article on Becky Stark in The New York Times
 Stark interviewed for cover article in Arthur magazine
 Associated Press interview in USA Today
 Becky Stark and Miranda July interview each other for Anthem magazine
 New Yorker article

1976 births
Living people
American folk singers
American women rock singers
Brown University alumni
Singers from Los Angeles
Bethesda-Chevy Chase High School alumni
The Decemberists
21st-century American women singers
21st-century American singers
The Living Sisters members